The 2016–17 Welsh Premier League (known as the Dafabet Welsh Premier League for sponsorship reasons) was the 25th season of the Welsh Premier League, the highest football league within Wales since its establishment in 1992. The New Saints are the defending champions. The fixtures were announced on 22 June 2016. The season began on 12 August 2016 and ended on 22 April 2017; the Europa League play-offs will follow afterwards.

Teams played each other twice on a home and away basis, before the league split into two groups at the end of January 2017 – the top six and the bottom six.

On 30 December 2016, The New Saints broke Ajax's 44-year-old world record for the longest winning streak in top-flight football with their 27th consecutive win in all competitions. Their record run of 27 wins came to an end with a 3–3 draw on 14 January 2017.

On 4 March 2017, The New Saints defeated Bangor 4–0 to clinch their sixth straight Welsh Premier League title and eleventh Welsh league title overall.

This was the final season the league was sponsored by Dafabet.

Teams

Haverfordwest County and Port Talbot Town were relegated out of the Welsh Premier League the previous season, while Cefn Druids were promoted as winners of the Cymru Alliance and Cardiff Metropolitan University were promoted as winners of Welsh Football League Division One. It will be Cardiff Metropolitan University's debut campaign in the league under that name, although they were formerly members when known as Inter Cardiff.

Stadia and locations

League table

Results
Teams play each other twice on a home and away basis, before the league split into two groups – the top six and the bottom six.

Matches 1–22

Matches 23–32

Top six

Bottom six

UEFA Europa League play-offs
Teams who finished in positions fourth to seventh at the end of the regular season participated in play-offs to determine the third participant for the 2017–18 UEFA Europa League, who qualified for the first qualifying round.

Semi-finals

Final

Season statistics

Top goalscorers

References
The league's rules are contained as a section of the Handbook of the Football Association of Wales.

External links

Cymru Premier seasons
2016–17 in Welsh football
Wales